Dovolnoye is a rural locality (a selo) and the administrative center of Dovolensky District, Novosibirsk Oblast, Russia. Population:

Geography 
Dovolnoye is located near the Bagan river.

References

Notes

Sources

Rural localities in Novosibirsk Oblast